Yun Sung-hwan (Hangul: 윤성환; born October 8, 1981 in Busan, South Korea) is a starting pitcher for the Samsung Lions of the KBO League. His nickname is Yun Taeja (Crown Prince Yun), for being the best pitcher that Sun Dong-yol has trained.

Amateur career

Professional career
Yun was selected by the Samsung Lions in the 2nd round (8th pick, 15th overall) of the  KBO Draft. 
Yun wanted to join the Lotte Giants, the team from his hometown, however, head coach Sun Dong-yol, currently the manager of Samsung Lions saw great potential in Yun and scouted him.

2009

On July 30, Yun pitched the whole game for the first time in his pro career against the LG Twins. He won against all 7 teams on August 5 and became the ace of the Samsung Lions.

Yun ranked first among KBO pitchers in total victories with 14 wins in 2009.

2015 
After the 2014 season, he broke the record for the best FA contract ever with a four-year, eight billion won contract (4.8 billion won, annual salary 800 million won).

References

External links
Career statistics and player information from Korea Baseball Organization

Yun Sung-hwan at Samsung Lions Baseball Club 

1981 births
Living people
South Korean baseball players
Samsung Lions players
KBO League pitchers
Sportspeople from Busan